WVEI may refer to:

WVEI (AM), a radio station (1440 AM) licensed to Worcester, Massachusetts, United States
WVEI-FM, a radio station (103.7 FM) licensed to Westerly, Rhode Island, United States
WWEI, a radio station (105.5 FM) licensed to Easthampton, Massachusetts, United States, which used the call sign WVEI-FM from 2006 to 2011